Shane Buckley (born 14 April 1992) is an Irish rugby union player for English RFU Championship side Ealing Trailfinders. He plays primarily as a number 8.

Professional career

Munster
Buckley made his Munster A debut on 17 December 2011, coming on as a replacement against Moseley in the British and Irish Cup. In March 2014, Buckley signed a development contract with the senior Munster squad for the 2014–15 season. Buckley was nominated for the John McCarthy Award for Munster Academy Player of the Year on 1 May 2014, an award Buckley won on 8 May 2014.

He made his debut for Munster on 5 September 2014, starting at Number 8 in the 14-13 opening 2014–15 Pro12 defeat against Edinburgh. Buckley signed a one-year contract extension with Munster in January 2015. In May 2016, it was announced that Buckley would leave Munster at the end of the 2015-16 season.

Nottingham
Buckley joined English RFU Championship side Nottingham ahead of the 2016–17 season, and later extended his contract with the club. Buckley was also invited to play for Wasps during their opening fixture of the 2018–19 Premiership Rugby Cup in October 2018.

Ealing Trailfinders
Buckley joined another RFU Championship club, Ealing Trailfinders, ahead of the 2019–20 season.

References

External links
Nottingham Profile
Munster Profile
U20 Six Nations Profile

1992 births
Living people
Irish rugby union players
Rugby union players from Cork (city)
Garryowen Football Club players
Munster Rugby players
Nottingham R.F.C. players
Wasps RFC players
Ealing Trailfinders Rugby Club players
Expatriate rugby union players in England
Irish expatriate rugby union players
Irish expatriate sportspeople in England
Rugby union flankers